Tinagma balteolella is a moth in the Douglasiidae family. It is found in Great Britain, France, Belgium, the Netherlands, Germany, Switzerland, Austria, Italy, Spain, the Czech Republic, Slovakia, Croatia, Hungary, Romania, Poland, Lithuania and Ukraine. It is also found in Morocco and Jordan.

The larvae feed on Echium vulgare and Echium biebersteini. They mine the stems of their host plant. The species overwinters in a cocoon.

References

Moths described in 1841
Douglasiidae